Kabilas  is a Village Development Committee in Tanahu District in the Gandaki Zone of central Nepal. At the time of the 1991 Nepal census, it had a population of 4,138 residing in 782 individual households.

References

External links
UN map of the municipalities of Tanahu District

Populated places in Tanahun District